James Milnor (June 20, 1773 Philadelphia – April 8, 1845 Manhattan, New York) was a member of the U.S. House of Representatives from Pennsylvania for two years (1811–1813), a lawyer for 16 years (1794 to 1810), and an Episcopal priest for  years (from mid-1814 to 1845).

Education & career 

Milnor attended public grammar school in Philadelphia and the University of Pennsylvania at Philadelphia, but initially did not graduate.  He studied law, was admitted to the bar in 1794 and commenced practice in Norristown, Pennsylvania.  He moved to Philadelphia in 1797 and continued the practice of his profession.  He was a member of the Philadelphia Common Council in 1800, a member of the Select Council from 1805 to 1810 and served as president in 1808 and 1809.  On July 29, 1819, the University of Pennsylvania conferred on Milnor the degree of Doctor of Divinity.  Milnor had begun studying divinity with Bishop William White while in Washington, D.C.

In October 1810, Milnor, a Federalist, was elected to represent the First Congressional District of Pennsylvania, in the Twelfth Congress.  After his time in Congress, he studied theology and was ordained as a minister of the Protestant Episcopal Church.  In 1814 he was appointed assistant minister of St. Peter's Church in Philadelphia and in 1816, he was elected rector of St. George's Chapel in New York City, a capacity he served in until his death in New York City in 1845. Among his parishioners was Mary Simpson, an African-American grocer who lived on John Street. Milnor was interred in Greenwood Cemetery, Brooklyn, New York.

Affiliations 
In 1798, Milnor had been an officer of Pennsylvania Society, which at the time, was waging a movement to abolish slavery.

Family 
James Milnor was married, on 28 February 1799, to Eleanor Pawling, daughter of Henry Pawling and Rebecca Bull.
James Milnor was the brother of William Milnor, also a former member of the U.S. House of Representatives from Pennsylvania.

References 
General references

Inline citations

Biographical note
 Many biographical sources wrongly state that Milnor died in 1844, an error that has been widely replicated.  With the advent of digitization of historical newspapers, we now know that he died on the same date, but in 1845.

University of Pennsylvania alumni
Pennsylvania lawyers
1773 births
1845 deaths
19th-century American Episcopal priests
Burials at Green-Wood Cemetery
American abolitionists
Politicians from Philadelphia
Federalist Party members of the United States House of Representatives from Pennsylvania
Christian abolitionists
19th-century American lawyers